Colma station was a railway station in Colma, California (modern Daly City, California). The depot was served by the Southern Pacific Railroad for most of its functional existence.

History
When the San Francisco and San Jose Railroad built their railway starting in San Francisco, the first stop outside of the city was constructed close to a schoolhouse near the intersection of Mission Street and Old San Pedro Road. Being the most prominent feature nearby at the time, the stop was named School House Station. Trains between San Francisco and San Francisquito Creek began running on October 23, 1863. In March 1868, the Railroad was acquired by the Southern Pacific and the line and station were integrated into their Coast Line. The opening of the Bayshore Cutoff significantly reduced passenger demand along the line, and service to the station ceased in 1942.

The station was deemed a historic site in the City of Daly City General Plan. Originally located at the modern Washington Street overpass of the Bay Area Rapid Transit line near the intersection of San Pedro Road, the station building was temporarily moved to a site across San Pedro Road during construction of the BART yard before arriving at its current location at the Colma Community Center.

References
Notes

Citations

Railway stations in San Mateo County, California
Former Southern Pacific Railroad stations in California
Railway stations in the United States opened in 1863
1863 establishments in California
Railway stations closed in 1942
1942 disestablishments in California